North Carolina's 46th Senate district is one of 50 districts in the North Carolina Senate. It has been represented by Republican Warren Daniel since 2013.

Geography
Since 2023, the district has covered all of Burke and McDowell counties, as well as part of Buncombe County. The district overlaps with the 85th, 86th, 113th, 114th, 115th, and 116th state house districts.

District officeholders since 2003

Election results

2022

2020

2018

2016

2014

2012

2010

2008

2006

2004

2002

References

North Carolina Senate districts
Burke County, North Carolina
McDowell County, North Carolina
Buncombe County, North Carolina